La Trompette is a restaurant located in Chiswick, London, opened by co-owners Nigel Platts-Martin and Chez Bruce's chef patron Bruce Poole. Since 2008, the restaurant has held one star in the Michelin Guide.

La Trompette was closed in January 2013 for wider building expansion. Rob Weston, after sixteen years as the head chef of The Square under chef patron Phil Howard, replaced La Trompette's previous head chef Anthony Boyd amid reopening in late February 2013.

See also
 List of Michelin starred restaurants

References 

Restaurants in London
Michelin Guide starred restaurants in the United Kingdom